Cyclophora dewitzi is a moth in the  family Geometridae. It is found in the Democratic Republic of Congo, Gabon, Ivory Coast and Nigeria.

References

Moths described in 1920
Cyclophora (moth)
Insects of the Democratic Republic of the Congo
Lepidoptera of West Africa
Moths of Africa